The 2009 Brazil and Paraguay blackout was a power outage that occurred throughout much of Brazil and for a short time the entirety of Paraguay, on Tuesday, November 10, to Friday, 20 November, 2009, at approximately 22:15 BST. The blackout affected an estimated 60 million people in Brazil.

Description 
Thousands of passengers were stranded as metro trains came to a halt and buses failed to cope with the volume of passengers. There were widespread reports of road accidents as street lighting and traffic lights failed. The blackout began about 22:15 on Tuesday and lasted until about 02:45 on Wednesday in São Paulo, although power was restored gradually in some places from before midnight.

Causes 
Heavy rains and strong winds caused three transformers on a key high-voltage transmission line to short circuit, cutting the line and automatically causing the complete loss of 14 GW of power and the  shutdown of the Itaipu Dam for the first time in its 25-year history. The power cut, which Brazilian officials said affected 18 of the country's 26 states, brought chaos to cities including São Paulo, Rio de Janeiro, Belo Horizonte, Campo Grande and Vitória.

Media such as Slashdot and 60 Minutes reported that the outage was the work of hackers.  However, in December, 2010, WikiLeaks released a US diplomatic cable which suggested otherwise. The cable also reported that it

represented a loss of 28,000 megawatts – or 45 percent of total Brazilian consumption at that instant – of electricity and left an estimated 87 million residents without power. Scrutiny has been intense and speculation rife over the cause of the incident, in large part due to the recent announcement of Rio as the host of the 2016 summer Olympics.

and indicated that the longest outage was 6 hours, in São Paulo, and details interim reports on what failures caused the outage, and responses under consideration.

President Luiz Inácio Lula da Silva arranged an emergency commission to enquire into the cause of the blackout. The blackout also unleashed a political stir as the  Minister of Energy has been summoned to testify before Congress.

Affected regions

Paraguay 

The Itaipu Dam is shared with Paraguay. In the immediate aftermath of its failure, interconnecting lines to Paraguay's other large powerplant, the Yacyreta Dam (in the border with Argentina), also failed. All of the country's territory was affected by the blackout.

Brazil 

Entirely affected states 
 São Paulo
 Rio de Janeiro
 Mato Grosso do Sul
 Espírito Santo

Partially affected states
 Rio Grande do Sul
 Santa Catarina
 Paraná
 Minas Gerais
 Mato Grosso
 Goiás
 Rondônia
 Acre
 Bahia
 Sergipe
 Alagoas
 Pernambuco
 Paraíba
 Rio Grande do Norte

See also 

 List of power outages
 Electricity sector in Brazil
 Energy policy of Brazil

References 

Brazil, 2009
Disasters in Brazil
2009 in Brazil
2009 in Paraguay
November 2009 events in South America
Disasters in Paraguay
2009 disasters in Brazil
2009 disasters in Paraguay